UFC: Fight for the Troops 2 (also known as UFC Fight Night 23) was a mixed martial arts event  held by the Ultimate Fighting Championship on January 22, 2011 at Fort Hood, near Killeen, Texas.  The event was the third that the UFC has hosted in cooperation with a US military base, following UFC Fight Night 7 and UFC: Fight for the Troops.

Background
The bout between Kenny Florian and Evan Dunham was expected for UFC 126, but was moved to this card to serve as the main event. On December 6, however, Florian pulled out of the bout due to a knee injury. Melvin Guillard was pulled from a planned preliminary bout with Yves Edwards and faced Dunham in the main event. Edwards instead faced TUF 12 alumnus Cody McKenzie.

On December 30, 2010, a bout between Mike Swick and David Mitchell was called off due to Mitchell suffering an injury and Swick dealing with his Esophageal Condition. A late replacement fight between Will Campuzano and Chris Cariaso was signed.

A lightweight bout between Cole Miller and Matt Wiman, which was originally scheduled to take place at UFC 125, was moved to this event.

Rani Yahya was expected to face Chan Sung Jung at this event, but Jung was forced from the card with an injury, and replaced by Mike Brown.

On January 11, 2011, Dana White announced that if Mark Hominick defeated George Roop at this event, he would become the top contender for the UFC Featherweight Championship and would face champion José Aldo at UFC 129.

On January 18, Dana White announced that the UFC would be streaming the McKenzie vs. Edwards and Johnson vs. Guymon fights for free on their official Facebook page.
However, on the night of the fights, UFC.com officials announced that four prelims would show, adding the Freire vs. Lowe and Brown vs. Yahya fights.

Results

Bonus Awards
Fighters were awarded $30,000 bonuses.

Fight of the Night: Yves Edwards vs. Cody McKenzie
Knockout of the Night: Melvin Guillard
Submission of the Night: Yves Edwards

References

UFC Fight Night
2011 in mixed martial arts
Mixed martial arts in Texas
Killeen, Texas
2011 in sports in Texas